The GAZ-M20 "Pobeda" (победа means victory) was a passenger car produced in the Soviet Union by GAZ from 1946 until 1958. It was also licensed to the Polish Passenger Automobile Factory and produced as the FSO Warszawa. Although usually known as the GAZ-M20, an original car's designation at that time was just M-20: M for "Molotovets" (the GAZ factory was named after Vyacheslav Molotov).

History
The first sketches of similar-looking cars were completed by Valentin Brodsky in 1938 and by Vladimir Aryamov in 1940, which revealed a growing tendency towards streamlined car design in the Soviet Union. Aryamov's two-door coupe GAZ-11-80, designed in 1940, greatly resembled the later Pobeda and was in many ways identical to it. However, after the German invasion of 1941 military priorities delayed the work on the new car and the factory was switched to military production. The first Pobeda was developed in the Soviet Union under chief engineer Andrei A. Liphart. Originally intended to be called "Rodina" (Homeland), the name "Pobeda" (Victory) was a back-up, but was preferred by Joseph Stalin. "How much does the homeland cost?" - he asked. The name was also chosen because the works started in 1943 at Gorky Avto Zavod (GAZ, "Gorky Car Plant"), when victory in World War II began to seem likely, and the car was to be a model for post-war times. The plant was later heavily bombarded, but work was unaffected. Styling was done by "the imaginative and talented Veniamin Samoilov".

The GAZ-M20 Pobeda was one of the first Soviet cars of original design and moreover at the front line of a new vogue in automobile design; only the front suspension and, partially, the unitized body were influenced by the 1938 Opel Kapitän (the choice of car may have been influenced by the acquisition of the tooling from Opel's Rüsselsheim factory as part of the war reparations package for the Soviet side, which also lead to the creation of the Moskvitch 400/420). It was one of the first cars to introduce ponton styling with slab sides, preceding many Western manufacturers. The M20 was the first Soviet car using entirely domestic body dies; it was designed against wooden bucks, which suffered warping, requiring last-minute tuning by GAZ factory employees. The first prototype was ready on November 6, 1944 (for an anniversary of the October Revolution). A number of parts such as the gearbox and the transmission for the Pobeda (especially the early models) were carried over from the Ford Model B-based GAZ-M1 and modernized GAZ 11-73. The first production model rolled off the assembly line on June 21, 1946. It was also the first Soviet automobile to have turn signals, two electric windshield wipers (rather than mechanical- or vacuum-operated ones), four-wheel hydraulic brakes, an electric heater, and a factory-installed AM radio. The car came to be a symbol of postwar Soviet life and is today a popular collector's item.

Design and development
During the design process, GAZ had to choose between a   inline six and a   inline four; Stalin preferred the four, so it was used. The same M-20 engine was later used on the ASU-57 light assault gun. In addition, the headlights were covered by an American patent.

Production started in 1946, only a year after the end of the world war, and was difficult due to serious economic and technical hardships caused by the war; by the end of 1946, only twenty-three cars were completed, virtually by hand. Truly mass production had to wait until 28 April 1947, and even then, only 700 were built before October 1948. Steel quality was below average, up to 60% was rejected, and the overall quality of the first cars was so low that production was actually stopped by order of the government and the company's director was fired. On August 31, 1948, the government issued a decree requiring the immediate improvement of quality and thorough testing of the new automobiles. The cars and their integral parts were subjected to detailed laboratory and on-road testing, opinions of the cars' drivers were carefully studied and taken into account.

After a reorganisation, solving the initial build quality issues, making 346 improvements and adding two thousand new tools, the Pobeda was returned to production. It had a new carburettor, different final drive ratio (5.125:1 rather than 4.7:1), strengthened rear springs, improved heater, and the ability to run on the low-grade 66 octane fuel typical in the Soviet Union. (Among the changes was a  lower rear seat, enabling military and police officers to ride without removing their caps). The improvements enabled the new Pobeda to reach  in 12 seconds, half the previous model's time. In January 1949, the state commission issued a report after testing the new model and its parts, where it noted the significant improvement of build quality, ruggedness and durability of the car, good fuel consumption and on-road performance, especially on poor roads.

The improved Pobeda entered production on 1 November 1949, and the techniques needed to develop and manufacture it effectively created the Soviet automobile industry.

Versions

Stock versions:
1946-1948 – early GAZ-M-20s.
1948-1954 – improved and massively produced cars with modernised leaf springs, thermostats and manual gears; heaters, water pumps and mechanical clock were added to the cars of this generation.
1955-1958 – GAZ-20V equipped with a new 52-PS engine and a radio.
Other versions:
A 4-door sedan prototype, the Pobeda-NAMI, was designed by NAMI in 1948 as a replacement for the M-20. While much of the car was identical to the production version, the difference was in the interior. The front bench seat was replaced with bucket seats and the smaller size of the front seats allowed the rear seat and truck wall to be moved forward, increasing trunk space. The model did not enter production as redesigning the production car would take too long and also the shape of the car was less recognizable compared to the production version. GAZ did not produce a sedan until the Volga in 1956.
A prototype cab-over-engine (forward control, COE) vehicle, the GAZ-013, was based on the Pobeda, but not built.
A column shift synchromesh gearbox appeared in 1950, replacing the floor-shifted "crash box". In 1949 debuted a cabriolet (without a separate designation, surviving until 1953), and a taxi M-20A, with cheaper interior (first regular taxi model in Moscow); some of the cabriolets were also used as taxis.
In 1949–53, 14,222 M-20s were built with 4-door convertible body (of 'cabrio coach' type), but sales were poor and the GAZ never returned to the idea of mass-producing a convertible. The only reason to create a cabriolet, less practical in Soviet climate, were low production capabilities of sheet metal, due to war damage.
In 1955, the first comfortable mass-produced monocoque all-wheel drive vehicle appeared, the M72, with a four-wheel drive system adapted from the contemporary Soviet GAZ-69. It was the brainchild of Vitaly Grachev, assistant to the GAZ-69's chief engineer, Grigory Moiseevich Wasserman. It used a standard Pobeda transmission, mated to the GAZ-69 front axle, leaf spring suspension, and transfer case, with a brand-new rear axle (used on no other vehicle, a rarity for Soviet car production). The body had fourteen panels added to strengthen the floor, frame, doors, and roof. Trim and interior were otherwise the same as the M20, and in all, 4,677 were built by end of production in 1958.
A limited edition M20G for the KGB (number unknown, but very small), powered by a  straight six (from the GAZ M12 ZIM), was also produced, giving the Pobeda a top speed reportedly , and  time was down to 16 seconds from the stock model's 34; handling was compromised by the extra front-end weight.

Total production of the Pobeda was 235,999, including 37,492 taxis and 14,222 cabriolets. A great number of cars was used by government organizations and government-owned corporations, including taxicab parks (there were no private taxis in the USSR). Despite its 16,000 ruble price tag, with average wage 800 ruble, the Pobeda was available to buy for ordinary citizens, and by 1954–1955 the demand for cars in the USSR started to exceed production, and there appeared long queues to buy a car. The Pobeda provided the first serious opportunity for the Soviet automobile industry to export cars, and "Western drivers found it to be almost indestructible".

The Pobeda was replaced by the GAZ M21 Volga.

Export
The car was a successful export for the USSR, and the design was licensed to the Polish FSO (Passenger Automobile Factory) factory in Warsaw, where it was built as the FSO Warszawa beginning in 1951, continuing until 1973. A few were reported to have been assembled in Pyongyang, North Korea, although their existence is disputed.

Technical details
Weighing , the Pobeda has a 2.1-litre sidevalve straight-four engine, derived from Chrysler's flathead six-cylinder design.

Gallery

Notes

References

External links

Main Russian Pobeda site by Artem Alekseyenko 
Pobeda by Jelle Jan Gerrits.
Estonian Pobeda Club Forum
Pobeda the SUV-version

Soviet automobiles
Executive cars
GAZ Group vehicles
Rear-wheel-drive vehicles
Sedans
1950s cars
Cars introduced in 1946